The Namakwa Civic Movement (NCM), is a regional political party in Namakwa District Municipality in South Africa. It is led by Dr. Gustav Bock, leader and party chairperson.

It was formed in 2021.

Election Results
The party contested its first elections in 2021, winning 8 seats in several local municipalities in the Namakwa District.

Municipal elections

References

2021 establishments in South Africa
Political parties established in 2021
Political parties in South Africa